Pingyuan County is a county in the northwest of Shandong province, People's Republic of China. It is administered by the prefecture-level city of Dezhou.

History 
At the end of the Han dynasty, Liu Bei began his political career as prefect of Pingyuan Commandery. The town was one of the starts for the anti-Western Boxer Rebellion.

The population was 437,584 in 1999.

Administrative divisions
As 2012, this County is divided to 2 subdistricts, 7 towns and 3 townships.
Subdistricts
Longmen Subdistrict
Taoyuan Subdistrict

Towns

Wangfenglou
Qiancao
Encheng
Wangmiao
Wanggaopu
Zhanghua
Jiaozhan

Townships
Fangzi Township
Wangdagua Township
Santang Township

Climate

References

Gaotang
Dezhou